Sir Walter Frederic Nicholson, KCB (22 July 1877 – 28 February 1946) was an English civil servant. Educated at Balliol College, Oxford, he joined the Civil Service in 1899, initially working as a clerk in the Admiralty. From 1920 to 1930, he was the Permanent Secretary of the Air Ministry. He was then the government member of the board of British Airways until 1937. He was appointed a Companion of the Order of the Bath in the 1916 New Year Honours, and was promoted to Knight Companion in the 1922 Birthday Honours.

References 

1877 births
1946 deaths
English civil servants
Alumni of Balliol College, Oxford
Knights Companion of the Order of the Bath